Emil William Chynn (born October 7, 1965) is a Chinese–American eye surgeon, author, researcher, and media personality. He has also appeared in Millionaire Matchmaker.

Career
Chynn was Director of Refractive Surgery at St. Vincent's Hospital in Manhattan, and then Director of Refractive Surgery and an Assistant Professor of Ophthalmology at SUNY Brooklyn/Long Island College Hospital. In the late 1990s he worked as a LASIK surgeon for TLC Manhattan, part of the TLC Laser Eye Centers, which was then the largest laser chain in North America, and listed in NASDAQ.  In 1999, he became the 1st LASIK surgeon in New York City to get LASIK himself. In 2000, he opened his own laser vision correction center, IWANT2020.com, Inc.

In 2001, Chynn was the first physician to arrive at Ground Zero on 9/11, where he set up the first emergency room and triage center at a Burger King across the street from the former World Trade Center.

In 2005, Chynn became the first laser vision correction surgeon in the New York Tri-State area to adopt exclusively Advanced Surface Ablation (ASA), which is an advancement on the older photorefractive keratectomy or PRK procedure, involving the non-cutting techniques LASEK and epi-LASEK, which have faster healing and recovery than PRK, but by avoiding cutting into the cornea, are safer than LASIK. In 2010, Dr. Chynn successfully performed the highest ASA procedure ever performed in the US, −22.00, on a patient from China.

Media coverage
In 2013, Chynn was featured on CNN and the Howard Stern Show, where he discussed both laser vision correction and his single dating life, and offered his $100,000 Ferrari to any matchmaker, amateur or professional, who introduced him to a "nice girl if she became his wife".

Chynn was appeared as one of the single millionaires on Bravo TV's Millionaire Matchmaker with Patti Stanger in March 2014. Chynn was the center of a media controversy surrounding several requests he posted to Craigslist, including a receptionist who would walk on his back and find him a wife.

References

1965 births
Living people
People from Tenafly, New Jersey
American surgeons
American medical researchers
American ophthalmologists
American philanthropists
Dartmouth College alumni
American male writers